The 2021–22 Detroit Pistons season was the 81st season of the franchise, the 74th in the National Basketball Association (NBA), and the fifth in Midtown Detroit. The Pistons attempted to improve on their record of 20–52 from last season. The Pistons held the first overall pick in the NBA draft for the first time since 1970. The Pistons finished at 23–59, missing the playoffs for the third consecutive season.

Draft picks

The Pistons held the first overall pick in the 2021 NBA draft, along with three second-round picks entering the draft. The 37th pick was traded to the Charlotte Hornets in exchange for the 57th pick.

Roster

Standings

Division

Conference

Game log

Preseason

|-style="background:#cfc;"
| 1
| October 6
| San Antonio
| 
| Jerami Grant (19)
| Isaiah Stewart (8)
| Joseph & Olynyk (6)
| Little Caesars Arena5,423
| 1–0
|-style="background:#fcc;"
| 2
| October 11
| @ Memphis
| 
| Grant & Diallo (13)
| Josh Jackson (6)
| Josh Jackson  (4)
| FedExForum10,286
| 1–1
|-style="background:#fcc;"
| 3
| October 13
| @ New York
| 
| Jerami Grant (18)
| Isaiah Stewart (8)
| Jackson & Lee (5)
| Madison Square Garden11,226
| 1–2
|-style="background:#cfc;"
| 4
| October 15
| Philadelphia
| 
| Jerami Grant (24)
| Isaiah Stewart (12)
| Saben Lee (8)
| Little Caesars Arena7,623
|  2–2

Regular season

|-style="background:#fcc;"
| 1
| October 20
| Chicago
| 
| Jerami Grant (28)
| Saddiq Bey (9)
| Saddiq Bey (4)
| Little Caesars Arena20,088
| 0–1
|-style="background:#fcc;"
| 2
| October 23
| @ Chicago
| 
| Saddiq Bey (20)
| Saddiq Bey (16)
| Hayes & Joseph (3)
| United Center18,888
| 0–2
|-style="background:#fcc;"
| 3
| October 25
| @ Atlanta
| 
| Bey & Olynyk (21)
| Bey & Stewart (7)
| Isaiah Stewart (5)
| State Farm Arena14,209
| 0–3
|-style="background:#fcc;"
| 4
| October 28
| @ Philadelphia
| 
| Saddiq Bey (19)
| Bey & Grant (6)
| Killian Hayes (4)
| Wells Fargo Center20,017
| 0–4
|-style="background:#cfc;"
| 5
| October 30
| Orlando
| 
| Jerami Grant (22)
| Isaiah Stewart (8)
| Cory Joseph (6)
| Little Caesars Arena11,423
| 1–4
|- style="background:#fcc;"
| 6
| October 31
| @ Brooklyn
| 
| Cory Joseph (13)
| Josh Jackson (5)
| Saddiq Bey (6)
| Barclays Center13,507
| 1–5

|- style="background:#fcc;"
| 7
| November 2
| Milwaukee
| 
| Jerami Grant (21)
| Isaiah Stewart (8)
| Killian Hayes (4)
| Little Caesars Arena9,254
| 1–6
|- style="background:#fcc;"
| 8
| November 4
| Philadelphia
| 
| Jerami Grant (27)
| Cade Cunningham (10)
| Cory Joseph (5)
| Little Caesars Arena8,702
| 1–7
|- style="background:#fcc;"
| 9
| November 5
| Brooklyn
| 
| Cade Cunningham (17)
| Kelly Olynyk (10)
| Cory Joseph (5)
| Little Caesars Arena14,235
| 1–8
|-style="background:#cfc;"
| 10
| November 10
| @ Houston
| 
| Jerami Grant (35)
| Saddiq Bey (9)
| Cory Joseph (5)
| Toyota Center15,350
| 2–8
|- style="background:#fcc;"
| 11
| November 12
| @ Cleveland
| 
| Jerami Grant (16)
| Bey & Stewart (7)
| Killian Hayes (5)
| Rocket Mortgage FieldHouse17,095
| 2–9
|-style="background:#cfc;"
| 12
| November 13
| @ Toronto
| 
| Jerami Grant (24)
| Saddiq Bey (8)
| Killian Hayes (10)
| Scotiabank Arena19,800
| 3–9
|- style="background:#fcc;"
| 13
| November 15
| Sacramento
| 
| Saddiq Bey (28)
| Isaiah Stewart (15)
| Cade Cunningham (8)
| Little Caesars Arena10,092
| 3–10
|-style="background:#cfc;"
| 14
| November 17
| Indiana
| 
| Jerami Grant (19) 
| Isaiah Stewart (11)
| Cade Cunningham (6)
| Little Caesars Arena11,457
| 4–10
|- style="background:#fcc;"
| 15
| November 19
| Golden State
| 
| Frank Jackson (27)
| Cade Cunningham (6)
| Cade Cunningham (6)
| Little Caesars Arena20,088
| 4–11
|- style="background:#fcc;"
| 16
| November 21
| LA Lakers
| 
| Jerami Grant (36) 
| Cade Cunningham (12)
| Cade Cunningham (10)
| Little Caesars Arena15,532
| 4–12
|- style="background:#fcc;"
| 17
| November 23
| Miami
| 
| Jerami Grant (21)
| Trey Lyles (9)
| Cory Joseph (9)
| Little Caesars Arena13,123
| 4–13
|- style="background:#fcc;"
| 18
| November 24
| @ Milwaukee
| 
| Trey Lyles (19)
| Cade Cunningham (8)
| Cade Cunningham (7)
| Fiserv Forum17,341
| 4–14
|- style="background:#fcc;"
| 19
| November 26
| @ LA Clippers
| 
| Jerami Grant (20)
| Isaiah Stewart (12)
| Cade Cunningham (6)
| Staples Center18,139
| 4–15
|- style="background:#fcc;"
| 20
| November 28
| @ LA Lakers
| 
| Jerami Grant (32)
| Bey & Cunningham (11)
| Killian Hayes (8)
| Staples Center18,997
| 4–16
|- style="background:#fcc;"
| 21
| November 30
| @ Portland
| 
| Cade Cunningham (26)
| Isaiah Stewart (14)
| Saddiq Bey (5)
| Moda Center16,071
| 4–17

|- style="background:#fcc;"
| 22
| December 2
| @ Phoenix
| 
| Jerami Grant (34)
| Isaiah Stewart (14)
| Cade Cunningham (5)
| Footprint Center18,055
| 4–18
|- style="background:#fcc;"
| 23
| December 6
| Oklahoma City
| 
| Cade Cunningham (28)
| Cade Cunningham (11)
| Cunningham, Grant & Hayes (5)
| Little Caesars Arena10,522
| 4–19
|- style="background:#fcc;"
| 24
| December 8
| Washington
| 
| Jerami Grant (28)
| Isaiah Stewart (10)
| Cory Joseph (5)
| Little Caesars Arena10,499
| 4–20
|- style="background:#fcc;"
| 25
| December 10
| @ New Orleans
| 
| Trey Lyles (18)
| Hamidou Diallo (7)
| Killian Hayes (6)
| Smoothie King Center15,828
| 4–21
|- style="background:#fcc;"
| 26
| December 12
| Brooklyn
| 
| Cade Cunningham (26)
| Isaiah Stewart (10)
| Cunningham & Lee (6)
| Little Caesars Arena15,289
| 4–22
|- style="background:#bbb"
| —
| December 14
| @ Chicago
| colspan="6" | Postponed due to COVID-19 (Rescheduled: January 11)  
|- style="background:#fcc;"
| 27
| December 16
| @ Indiana
| 
| Saddiq Bey (28)
| Saddiq Bey (10)
| Bey & Lee (5)
| Gainbridge Fieldhouse13,596
| 4–23
|- style="background:#fcc;"
| 28
| December 18
| Houston
|  
| Saddiq Bey (23)
| Isaiah Stewart (8)
| Cade Cunningham (11)
| Little Caesars Arena13,722
| 4–24
|- style="background:#cfc;"
| 29
| December 19
| Miami
| 
| Saddiq Bey (26)
| Isaiah Stewart (14)
| Cade Cunningham (10)
| Little Caesars Arena15,188
| 5–24
|- style="background:#fcc;"
| 30
| December 21
| @ New York
|  
| Saben Lee (16)
| Isaiah Stewart (11)
| Cade Cunningham (8)
| Madison Square Garden17,906
| 5–25
|- style="background:#fcc;"
| 31
| December 23
| @ Miami
|  
| Trey Lyles (28)
| Saddiq Bey (10)
| Cory Joseph (9)
| FTX Arena19,600
| 5–26
|- style="background:#fcc;"
| 32
| December 26
| @ San Antonio
|  
| Hamidou Diallo (28)
| Cheick Diallo (9)
| Derrick Walton (6)
| AT&T Center14,715
| 5–27
|- style="background:#fcc;"
| 33
| December 29
| New York
|  
| Saddiq Bey (32)
| Cheick Diallo (13)
| Derrick Walton (9)
| Little Caesars Arena18,312
| 5–28

|- style="background:#cfc;"
| 34
| January 1
| San Antonio
| 
| Hamidou Diallo (34)
| Saddiq Bey (17)
| Derrick Walton (6)
| Little Caesars Arena18,911
| 6–28
|- style="background:#cfc;"
| 35
| January 3
| @ Milwaukee
| 
| Saddiq Bey (34)
| Hamidou Diallo (9)
| Cade Cunningham (7)
| Fiserv Forum17,341
| 7–28
|- style="background:#fcc;"
| 36
| January 5
| @ Charlotte
| 
| Trey Lyles (17)
| Trey Lyles (7)
| Cade Cunningham (7)
| Spectrum Center14,427
| 7–29
|- style="background:#fcc;"
| 37
| January 6
| @ Memphis
| 
| Saben Lee (14)
| Isaiah Stewart (8)
| Cade Cunningham (6)
| FedExForum12,983
| 7–30
|- style="background:#cfc;"
| 38
| January 8
| Orlando
| 
| Hamidou Diallo (17)
| Trey Lyles (13)
| Cunningham & Joseph (5)
| Little Caesars Arena18,644
| 8–30
|- style="background:#cfc;"
| 39
| January 10
| Utah
| 
| Bey & Cunningham (29)
| Hamidou Diallo (8)
| Cade Cunningham (8)
| Little Caesars Arena17,834
| 9–30
|- style="background:#fcc;"
| 40
| January 11
| @ Chicago
| 
| Josh Jackson (16)
| Cunningham, Diallo & Stewart (7)
| Killian Hayes (5)
| United Center19,886
| 9–31
|- style="background:#cfc;"
| 41
| January 14
| Toronto
| 
| Trey Lyles (21)
| Cunningham & Lyles (7)
| Cunningham & Hayes (5)
| Little Caesars Arena18,011
| 10–31
|- style="background:#fcc;"
| 42
| January 16
| Phoenix
| 
| Cunningham & Joseph (21)
| Lyles & Stewart (6)
| Cory Joseph (7)
| Little Caesars Arena18,178
| 10–32
|- style="background:#fcc;"
| 43
| January 18
| @ Golden State
|  
| Rodney McGruder (19)
| Hamidou Diallo (13)
| Cory Joseph (6)
| Chase Center18,064
| 10–33
|- style="background:#cfc;"
| 44
| January 19
| @ Sacramento
| 
| Saddiq Bey (30)
| Kelly Olynyk (9)
| Cory Joseph (9)
| Golden 1 Center12,907
| 11–33
|- style="background:#fcc;"
| 45
| January 21
| @ Utah
| 
| Cade Cunningham (25)
| Isaiah Stewart (9)
| Cunningham & Olynyk (5)
| Vivint Arena18,306
| 11–34
|- style="background:#fcc;"
| 46
| January 23
| @ Denver
| 
| Cunningham, Lyles & Stewart (18)
| Saddiq Bey (7)
| Cade Cunningham (8)
| Ball Arena14,060
| 11–35
|- style="background:#fcc;"
| 47
| January 25
| Denver
| 
| Cade Cunningham (34)
| Cade Cunningham (8)
| Cunningham & Hayes (8)
| Little Caesars Arena16,023
| 11–36
|- style="background:#fcc;"
| 48
| January 28
| @ Orlando
| 
| Trey Lyles (18)
| Isaiah Stewart (8)
| Killian Hayes (6)
| Amway Center13,156
| 11–37
|- style="background:#cfc;"
| 49
| January 30
| Cleveland
| 
| Saddiq Bey (31)
| Isaiah Stewart (12)
| Cade Cunningham (10)
| Little Caesars Arena16,811
| 12–37

|- style="background:#fcc;"
| 50
| February 1
| New Orleans
| 
| Cory Joseph (18)
| Isaiah Stewart (11)
| Kelly Olynyk (6)
| Little Caesars Arena15,499
| 12–38
|- style="background:#fcc;"
| 51
| February 3
| Minnesota
| 
| Frank Jackson (25)
| Bey & Stewart (13)
| Saddiq Bey (8)
| Little Caesars Arena15,523
| 12–39
|- style="background:#fcc;"
| 52
| February 4
| Boston
| 
| Bey & Diallo (21)
| Isaiah Stewart (17)
| Killian Hayes (5)
| Little Caesars Arena17,584
| 12–40
|- style="background:#fcc;"
| 53
| February 6
| @ Minnesota
| 
| Saddiq Bey (24)
| Isaiah Stewart (12)
| Killian Hayes (8)
| Target Center16,487
| 12–41
|- style="background:#fcc;"
| 54
| February 8
| @ Dallas
| 
| Hamidou Diallo (18)
| Isaiah Stewart (15)
| Saddiq Bey (6)
| American Airlines Center19,200
| 12–42
|- style="background:#fcc;"
| 55
| February 10
| Memphis
| 
| Jerami Grant (20)
| Hamidou Diallo (10)
| Cory Joseph (9)
| Little Caesars Arena18,744
| 12–43
|- style="background:#fcc;"
| 56
| February 11
| Charlotte
| 
| Saddiq Bey (25)
| Isaiah Stewart (12)
| Killian Hayes (12)
| Little Caesars Arena20,088
| 12–44
|- style="background:#fcc;"
| 57
| February 14
| @ Washington
| 
| Saddiq Bey (24)
| Isaiah Stewart (9)
| Saddiq Bey (5)
| Capital One Arena10,793
| 12–45
|- style="background:#cfc;"
| 58
| February 16
| @ Boston
| 
| Jerami Grant (24)
| Saddiq Bey (11)
| Bey & Cunningham (6)
| TD Garden19,156
| 13–45
|- align="center"
|colspan="9" bgcolor="#bbcaff"|All-Star Break
|- style="background:#cfc;"
| 59
| February 24
| Cleveland
| 
| Hamidou Diallo (21)
| Isaiah Stewart (8)
| Cade Cunningham (6)
| Little Caesars Arena15,622
| 14–45
|- style="background:#fcc;"
| 60
| February 26
| Boston
| 
| Cade Cunningham (25)
| Isaiah Stewart (10)
| Killian Hayes (4)
| Little Caesars Arena19,122
| 14–46
|- style="background:#cfc;"
| 61
| February 27
| @ Charlotte
| 
| Saddiq Bey (28)
| Isaiah Stewart (11)
| Killian Hayes (7)
| Spectrum Center15,348
| 15–46

|-style="background:#fcc;"
| 62
| March 1
| @ Washington
| 
| Jerami Grant (26)
| Cunningham & Stewart (9)
| Cunningham & Hayes (5)
| Capital One Arena12,122
| 15–47
|- style="background:#cfc;"
| 63
| March 3
| @ Toronto
| 
| Jerami Grant (26)
| Cade Cunningham (12)
| Cory Joseph (6)
| Scotiabank Arena19,548
| 16–47
|- style="background:#cfc;"
| 64
| March 4
| Indiana
| 
| Saddiq Bey (25)
| Isaiah Stewart (13)
| Jerami Grant (5)
| Little Caesars Arena17,244
| 17–47
|- style="background:#cfc;"
| 65
| March 7
| Atlanta
| 
| Cade Cunningham (28)
| Marvin Bagley III (10)
| Cade Cunningham (10)
| Little Caesars Arena14,942
| 18–47
|-style="background:#fcc;"
| 66
| March 9
| Chicago
| 
| Cade Cunningham (22)
| Marvin Bagley III (6)
| Bey & Cunningham (6)
| Little Caesars Arena18,022
| 18–48
|- style="background:#fcc;"
| 67
| March 11
| @ Boston
| 
| Cade Cunningham (27)
| Marvin Bagley III (11)
| Bey, Cunningham & Joseph (6)
| TD Garden19,156
| 18–49
|- style="background:#fcc;"
| 68
| March 13
| LA Clippers
| 
| Cade Cunningham (23)
| Cade Cunningham (9)
| Cade Cunningham (10)
| Little Caesars Arena19,313
| 18–50
|- style="background:#fcc;"
| 69
| March 15
| @ Miami
| 
| Jerami Grant (22)
| Isaiah Stewart (8) 
| Killian Hayes (8)
| FTX Arena19,600
| 18–51
|- style="background:#cfc;"
| 70
| March 17
| @ Orlando
| 
| Saddiq Bey (51)
| Marvin Bagley III (11)
| Joseph & Lee (7)
| Amway Center14,369
| 19–51
|- style="background:#fcc;"
| 71
| March 19
| @ Cleveland
| 
| Jerami Grant (40)
| Isaiah Stewart (12)
| Cade Cunningham (10)
| Rocket Mortgage FieldHouse19,432
| 19–52
|- style="background:#fcc;"
| 72
| March 21
| Portland
| 
| Bey & Cunningham (25)
| Isaiah Stewart (13)
| Cade Cunningham (7)
| Little Caesars Arena14,923
| 19–53
|- style="background:#cfc;"
| 73
| March 23
| Atlanta
| 
| Jerami Grant (21)
| Isaiah Stewart (10)
| Cade Cunningham (8)
| Little Caesars Arena16,212
| 20–53
|- style="background:#fcc;"
| 74
| March 25
| Washington
| 
| Marvin Bagley III (25) 
| Isaiah Stewart (8)
| Cade Cunningham (9)
| Little Caesars Arena18,943
| 20–54
|- style="background:#fcc;"
| 75
| March 27
| New York
| 
| Marvin Bagley III (27)
| Isaiah Stewart (10)
| Cade Cunningham (7)
| Little Caesars Arena19,304
| 20–55
|- style="background:#fcc;"
| 76
| March 29
| @ Brooklyn
| 
| Cade Cunningham (34)
| Isaiah Stewart (11)
| Kelly Olynyk (8)
| Barclays Center17,559
| 20–56
|- style="background:#cfc;"
| 77
| March 31
| Philadelphia
| 
| Cade Cunningham (27)
| Isaiah Stewart (12)
| Cade Cunningham (6)
| Little Caesars Arena20,023
| 21–56

|- style="background:#cfc;"
| 78
| April 1
| @ Oklahoma City
| 
| Hayes & Jackson (26)
| Isaiah Livers (11)
| Saben Lee (12)
| Paycom Center16,961
| 22–56
|- style="background:#cfc;"
| 79
| April 3
| @ Indiana
| 
| Saddiq Bey (31)
| Braxton Key (9)
| Carsen Edwards (9)
| Gainbridge Fieldhouse17,407
| 23–56
|- style="background:#fcc;"
| 80
| April 6
| Dallas
| 
| Cade Cunningham (25)
| Isaiah Stewart (14)
| Cade Cunningham (9)
| Little Caesars Arena18,422
| 23–57
|- style="background:#fcc;"
| 81
| April 8
| Milwaukee
| 
| Rodney McGruder (26)
| Isaiah Stewart (12)
| Cade Cunningham (7)
| Little Caesars Arena22,088
| 23–58
|- style="background:#fcc;"
| 82
| April 10
| @ Philadelphia
| 
| Luka Garza (20)
| Luka Garza (10)
| Saben Lee (8)
| Wells Fargo Center21,459
| 23–59

Transactions

Overview

Trades

Free agency

Re-signed

Additions

Subtractions

References

Detroit Pistons
Detroit Pistons
Detroit Pistons
Detroit Pistons seasons